Costessey Hall (pronounced and sometimes spelt Cossey Hall, also written as Cotesby Hall) was a manor house in Costessey, Norfolk, England, four miles west of Norwich. The first mention of it dates to 1066, when William I gave it to Alan Rufus, Earl of Richmond. It was then described as Costessey Manor.

History
In 1555, Mary I awarded it to Sir Henry Jerningham, for his support for Mary on the accession of Lady Jane Grey. It then had 22 sub-manors in Norfolk, plus manors in Hereford and Gloucestershire. Jerningham built a new manor house on the south side of the River Tud flowing through Costessey. The original manor house remained on the north side of the river and is still standing in Costessey Park. It may have been granted to Anne of Cleves by Henry VIII.

From 1826 to 1836, J. C. Buckler built a Gothic castle for Lord Stafford Jerningham which was several times larger than the original Tudor hall.

Demolition
In 1913, the contents of the house were sold, and the hall was left empty. At the start of World War I, it was commandeered by the War Office. In 1919, it was decided to demolish the hall. The house was demolished in 1925. The belfry block by the 18th fairway of the Costessey Park Golf Course is all that remains.

Further information
See Costessey

References

Country houses in Norfolk
Tudor England
British country houses destroyed in the 20th century
Demolished buildings and structures in England
Buildings and structures demolished in 1925